John Pritchett Gillis (6 September 1803 – 25 February 1873) was a commodore in the United States Navy.  He served in the Navy from 1825 until 1866 and saw military action in the Mexican-American War and the U.S. Civil War.

Biography

Gillis was born in Wilmington, Delaware. As a teenager, he moved to Illinois in 1819 with his family but later came back to Delaware. He was promoted to lieutenant in 1837 and his first command was the schooner Albion.

He served with distinction in the Mexican–American War at the capture of Tuxpan.  In 1841, he was married to Elizabeth Tatnall.  In 1853–54, he sailed with Commodore Matthew C. Perry's expedition to open Japan to the West.  He was promoted to commander in 1855.

In 1861, he served in the Atlantic Blockading Squadron, was cited for bravery at the Battle of Port Royal and at the Battle of Hatteras Inlet and he was promoted to captain.

In 1862 and 1863, he served in the Gulf of Mexico as part of the Gulf Blockading Squadron of the Union blockade to prevent the movement of confederate ships. He fell severely ill in 1864, took medical leave and saw no more action in the Civil War. 

Gillis was a charter member of the Historical Society of Delaware in 1864 and donated many of his personal items collected over years of Navy service.

After the death of Admiral Samuel Francis DuPont in 1865, Gillis became the highest-ranking military officer from Delaware.

He completed his career serving at the New York and Philadelphia Navy Yards and was promoted to commodore before his retirement in 1866.  He was a member of the Pennsylvania Commandery of the Military Order of the Loyal Legion of the United States and was assigned insignia number 267.

Commodore Gillis died on February 25, 1873, in Wilmington and is interred in the Wilmington and Brandywine Cemetery.

Namesake
The destroyer  was named for him and Rear Admiral James Henry Gillis.

Footnotes

References

1803 births
1873 deaths
Burials at Wilmington and Brandywine Cemetery
People from Wilmington, Delaware
People of Delaware in the American Civil War
Union Navy officers
United States Navy commodores
United States Navy personnel of the Mexican–American War